Alejandro Viedma Vega (born 16 April 1999) is a Spanish professional footballer who plays for Córdoba CF as a central midfielder.

Club career
Born in Jaén, Andalusia, Viedma joined FC Barcelona's youth setup in 2011, after representing Sevilla FC, Real Jaén and Atlético Jaén FC. On 13 July 2016 he returned to Sevilla, after agreeing to a two-year deal, and was assigned to the Juvenil A squad.

On 21 December 2017, Viedma made his professional debut with the reserves by coming on as a late substitute for José Alonso Lara in a 0–3 Segunda División away loss against CD Numancia. On 30 January 2019, he moved to another reserve team, Club Recreativo Granada in Segunda División B.

Viedma scored his first senior goal on 23 February 2019, netting his team's only in a 1–2 home loss against his former side Sevilla Atlético. The following 31 January, he signed for Cádiz CF and was assigned to the B-team also in division three.

On 10 September 2020, Viedma was transferred to SD Ponferradina; Cádiz retained a percentage over a future sale. The following 2 July, after featuring rarely, he moved to Segunda División RFEF side Córdoba CF on a one-year deal.

Personal life
VIedma's father Juan Antonio was also a footballer and a midfielder. He never appeared in any higher than the third tier.

References

External links

1999 births
Living people
Footballers from Jaén, Spain
Spanish footballers
Association football midfielders
Segunda División players
Segunda División B players
Sevilla Atlético players
Club Recreativo Granada players
Cádiz CF B players
SD Ponferradina players
Córdoba CF players